Bro culture is a subculture of young people (originally young men, hence "brother culture") who spend time partying with others like themselves. Although the original image of the bro lifestyle is associated with sports apparel and fraternities, it lacks a consistent definition. Most aspects vary regionally such as in California where it overlaps with surf culture. Oxford Dictionaries have noted that bros frequently self-identify with neologisms containing the word "bro" as a prefix or suffix.

Etymology and history
Bro was originally an abbreviated form of the word brother but began to assume non-familial connotations in the 20th century. In this evolution, it was first used to refer to another man, such as a "guy" or "fellow". In these ways, it was semantically similar to the use of "brother". In the 1970s, bro came to refer to a male friend rather than just another man. The word became associated with young men who spend time partying with others like themselves. Oxford Dictionaries identified the use of the term "bro" as the one "defining feature" of the changing cultural attributes of young manhood. Other variations exist such as brah, breh, bruh (African American Vernacular English), Bruv (British).

The applications of bro subculture correlate with neologisms that include the word. The word is used as a modifier for compound terms such as "brogrammer" and "curlbro". Oxford Dictionaries wrote that the term "lends itself" to compounding and blending, with combinations such as "bro-hug" and "bro-step" and portmanteaux such as "bro-down", "bromance", and "brohemian". This creation of neologisms was called "portmanbros" by 2009. Oxford compared this trend to man- prefixes (e.g., man cave, mansplaining, manscaping) but noted that the bro portmanteaux subset refers to a smaller portion of masculinity, noting that many of the terms were "stunt coinages" with little hope of widespread adoption. However, the term "bromance", whose first usage was recorded in a 2001 issue of TransWorld Surf, entered the Oxford English Dictionary. The term "bro-hug" was used at least eight times in The New York Times between 2010 and 2013 and "brogrammer" once became the center of Silicon Valley gender conversations. In comparison to the "hipster" modifier, Oxford Dictionaries called the "bro" modifier more playful, and responsible for making the subculture "ripe for (often self-inflicted) mockery".

Characteristics

Bro culture is not defined consistently or concretely, but refers to a type of "fratty masculinity," predominantly white, associated with frayed-brim baseball hats, oxford shirts, sports team T-shirts, and boat shoes or sandals. NPR noted that bros could include people of color and women. 

NPR identified four types of bros: dudely, jockish, preppy, and stoner-ish. In their description, dudely bros form close homosocial friendships in a group, jockish bros are defined by ability at team sports tempered by interest in alcohol, preppy bros wear "conservatively casual" clothes such as Abercrombie and Fitch and flaunt "social privilege", and stoner-ish bros may or may not use cannabis but speak in a relaxed fashion and exude the air of surfers. The gay community on Reddit has coined the term "gaybro" to refer to gay men who exhibit bro characteristics in defiance of the usual stereotypes of gay male behavior.

Oxford Dictionaries identify bros as those who use the word to refer to others, such as in the example of "don't tase me, bro", in which the taserer is not a bro, but the tased is. Oxford also recognized Neil Patrick Harris' character Barney Stinson on the sitcom How I Met Your Mother as "the quintessence of a certain iteration of the contemporary bro," noting how his language uses the word liberally. A survey from NPR's Codeswitch blog named popular figures such as Matthew McConaughey, Brody Jenner, Joe Rogan, Dane Cook, and John Mayer as representative of bro subculture, with Ryan Lochte as their "platonic ideal of bro-dom".

Lacrosse bro (Lax Bro)
Lax bro subculture is defined as a laid-back ("chill") lifestyle associated with lacrosse. The bounds of the subculture are loose, but its character traits include "understated confidence that critics call arrogance", long hair known as "lettuce," colorful board shorts, flat-brim baseball hats, and colorful half-calf socks. The bands O.A.R., Dispatch, and Dave Matthews Band are associated with lax bros. Typical lax bro attitude and style are common in middle schools and universities according to a 2012 report in The Boston Globe. Enthusiasts praise the subculture's sense of identity and popularization of a sport indigenous to the United States, while detractors take issue with the "preppie/frat boy image that glorifies elitism and wealth, and values flash over hard work".

Brogrammer

The phenomenon of the brogrammer sees bro culture take root in the technology industry. The term is almost always applied pejoratively, generally in reference to a workplace culture that undervalues people who do not fit into the bro lifestyle, particularly women. Brogrammer culture can be contrasted with geek culture, which is said to value ability and passion over image.

In 2013, former Microsoft game designer Daniel Cook wrote that the company was responsible for developing the bro subculture within video gaming, explaining that the "Xbox put machismo, ultra-violence and chimpboys with backwards caps in the spotlight. [...] Gamers were handed a pre-packaged group identity via the propaganda machine of a mega corporation." Cook writes that Microsoft has done this in order to distance the Xbox from its console competitors, which were portrayed as "kids platform[s]".

Criticism 
Since 2013, the term has been adopted by feminists and the media to refer to a misogynist culture within an organization or community. In a New York Magazine article in September 2013, Ann Friedman wrote: "Bro once meant something specific: a self-absorbed young white guy in board shorts with a taste for cheap beer. But it’s become a shorthand for the sort of privileged ignorance that thrives in groups dominated by wealthy, white, straight men." Vox referred to Silicon Valley's "bro culture problem" in its review of Emily Chang's book Brotopia. In 2014 and 2017, Inc published articles using the term in a similarly pejorative manner.

In its coverage of the 2019 Telegramgate scandal, in which investigative journalists published text messages written by the governor of Puerto Rico, The New York Times referred to "an arrogant 'bro' culture of elites who joked about making chumps out of even their own supporters."

See also

 Bro Code 
 Dude
 Fratire
 Lad culture

References

Adolescence
Drinking culture
Homosociality
Interpersonal relationships
Masculinity
Men in the United States
Men's culture
Men's movement
Pejorative terms for people
Slang terms for men
Social groups
Stereotypes of white Americans
Stereotypes of white men
Subcultures
Youth culture in the United States